Suresh Narayan Lad is an
Indian politician serving as 
member of the 13th Maharashtra Legislative Assembly. He represents the Karjat Assembly Constituency. He belongs to the Nationalist Congress Party. He was elected consecutively for 2 terms in the Maharashtra Legislative Assembly in 2009 and 2014.

References

Nationalist Congress Party politicians from Maharashtra
People from Raigad district
Maharashtra MLAs 2014–2019
Living people
Marathi politicians
Year of birth missing (living people)